Rebecca Wiasak (born 24 May 1984) is an Australian track cyclist. She represented her nation at the 2015 UCI Track Cycling World Championships where she became a world champion in individual pursuit. In January 2015 she was announced as part of the inaugural line-up for the High5 Dream Team. In 2017, Wiasak raced domestically for ACTAS on the track, for High5 Dream Team in Australia and in the United States of America for Fearless Femme Racing on the road.

In 2009 Wiasak represented Australia in Lithuanian World Games competing in women's basketball. After missing out of selection to compete at a major international Games at the Glasgow 2014 and Rio 2016, Wiasak was selected for her first Commonwealth Games. At the 2018 Gold Coast Commonwealth Games, she set a new Australian record beating her previous national record set at the Paris 2015 track world championships, and Wiasak was one of four riders to beat the previous Commonwealth Games individual pursuit record Joanna Rowsell set in 2014.

Major results

2014
BikeNZ Classic
1st Points Race
2nd Omnium
Oceania Track Championships
2nd Individual Pursuit
2nd Team Pursuit (with Ashlee Ankudinoff, Georgia Baker, Lauren Perry and Elissa Wundersitz)
3rd Scratch Race
2nd Scatch Race, BikeNZ Cup

2015
 1st  Individual pursuit, UCI Track World Championships
1st Individual Pursuit, South Australian Grand Prix

2016
 1st  Individual pursuit, UCI Track World Championships

2017
 1st  Individual pursuit, National Track Championships
 2nd Team Pursuit, UCI Track World Championships
 4th Individual Time Trial, Australian National Time Trial Championships

2018
 1st  Australian National Criterium Championships
 2nd Individual Pursuit, Commonwealth Games
 3rd Individual Pursuit, Australian National Track Championships

2019
 1st  Australian National Criterium Championships
5th Overall Lexus of Blackburn Bay Cycling Classic

References

External links
 Official website
 
 
 
 
 
 Rebecca Wiasak at Commonwealth Games Australia

1984 births
Living people
ACT Academy of Sport alumni
Australian female cyclists
Australian people of Lithuanian descent
Australian people of Polish descent
Australian people of Russian descent
Commonwealth Games silver medallists for Australia
Cyclists at the 2018 Commonwealth Games
Sportspeople from Geelong
Commonwealth Games medallists in cycling
Medallists at the 2018 Commonwealth Games